Mária Lázár (18 April 1895 – 1 October 1983) was a Hungarian film actress. She was born Mária Czartoriszky in Herkulesfürdõ, Austria-Hungary, and died in Budapest, Hungary. She was married three times: Ihász Lajos színész (1916–1946), Burger Antal, and Kiár András.

Selected filmography
 A Levágott kéz (1920) 
 Haus ohne Tür und ohne Fenster (1922)
 Fehér galambok fekete városban (1923)
 I defended a woman (1938)
 Number 111 (1938)
 One Night in Transylvania (1941)
 Magdolna (1942)
 Gerolsteini kaland (1957)
 A Certain Major (1960)
 Az orvos halála (1966)

References

External links
 

1895 births
1983 deaths
Hungarian film actresses
Hungarian silent film actresses
20th-century Hungarian actresses
Czartoryski family
Burials at Farkasréti Cemetery
People from Caraș-Severin County